3,4-Dichloroamphetamine (DCA), is an amphetamine derived drug invented by Eli Lilly in the 1960s, which has a number of pharmacological actions. It acts as a highly potent and selective serotonin releasing agent (SSRA) and binds to the serotonin transporter with high affinity, but also acts as a selective serotonergic neurotoxin in a similar manner to the related para-chloroamphetamine, though with slightly lower potency. It is also a monoamine oxidase inhibitor (MAOI), as well as a very potent inhibitor of the enzyme phenylethanolamine N-methyl transferase which normally functions to transform noradrenaline into adrenaline in the body.

Synthesis

The reaction of 3,4-Dichlorobenzyl Chloride [102-47-6] (1) with cyanide anion gives 3,4-Dichlorophenylacetonitrile [3218-49-3] (2). Reaction with sodium methoxide and ethylacetate gives Alpha-Acetoxy-3,4-Dichlorobenzeneacetonitrile, CID:14318103 (3). Removal of the nitrile group in the presence of sulfuric acid gives 3,4-Dichlorophenylacetone [6097-32-1] (4). Oxime formation with hydroxylamine gives N-[1-(3,4-dichlorophenyl)propan-2-ylidene]hydroxylamine, CID:74315855 (5). Reduction of the oxime completed the synthesis of 3,4-Dichloroamphetamine (6).

See also 
 3-Methoxy-4-methylamphetamine
 Cericlamine
 Chlorphentermine
 Clortermine
 Etolorex
 3,4-Methylenedioxyamphetamine
 Parachloroamphetamine
 Paramethoxyamphetamine

References 

Monoamine oxidase inhibitors
Neurotoxins
Serotonin-norepinephrine-dopamine releasing agents
Serotonin releasing agents
Substituted amphetamines